Elmer Ellsworth Adams (December 31, 1861 – May 24, 1950) was an American businessman, newspaper editor, and politician.

Adams was born in Waterbury, Vermont and moved to Fergus Falls, Otter Tail County, Minnesota, in 1878. He graduated from University of Minnesota in 1884. Adams was the editor of The Fergus Falls Journal. He was also involved in the banking and milling businesses. Adams served in the Minnesota House of Representatives from 1905 to 1910, in 1915 and 1916, and in 1919 and 1920. He then served in the Minnesota Senate from 1931 to 1934 and from 1939 to 1942. Adams was a Republican.

References

1861 births
1950 deaths
People from Fergus Falls, Minnesota
People from Waterbury, Vermont
University of Minnesota alumni
Businesspeople from Minnesota
Editors of Minnesota newspapers
Members of the Minnesota House of Representatives
Minnesota state senators